Theatre or theater refers to representational performing arts, and semantically related to a stage.

It may also refer to:

 Theater (structure), a building with a stage and audience seating for performances
 Movie theater, a building used to show films to an audience

Popular culture 
 Theatre (band), a mathcore band from South Africa
 Theatre (album), a 1983 album by George Gruntz
 "The Theatre", a song by the Pet Shop Boys on the 1993 album Very
 "Theater" (song), the German entry to the 1980 Eurovision Song Contest
 Theatre (novel), a 1937 novel by W. Somerset Maugham
 Theatre (film), a 1928 German silent film

Other uses
 Theater (Metro Rail), a rail station in Buffalo, New York
 Theater (warfare), large geographic area where conflict occurs
 Operating theater (or operating room), a room for carrying out surgical operations
 Pejorative term, in the sense of "an act"(pretense): actions taken by an individual or authority to create the impression of doing something useful or valuable, while achieving little. For example:
 Security Theater, actions carried out by an authority to give the public the impression of security while doing little or nothing to actually achieving it.
 Hygiene Theater, the practice of taking hygiene measures that are intended to give the illusion of improved safety while doing little to actually reduce any risk.

See also 
 The Theatre, an English playhouse in Shoreditch, London active from  1576, demolished 1598 (timbers used for construction of the original Globe Theatre)
 The Theatre Chipping Norton, Oxfordshire, England
 The Theatre, Leeds, West Yorkshire, England
 Theatre Journal, quarterly academic journal published by the Association for Theatre in Higher Education
 The Theatre (magazine), published in London between 1877 and 1897
 Gaiety Theatre (disambiguation)